Gravitcornutia caracae is a species of moth of the family Tortricidae. It is found in Minas Gerais, Brazil.

The wingspan is 11 mm. The ground colour of the forewings is brownish white with brownish suffusions. The markings are brownish. The hindwings are brownish cream, but browner in the apex area.

Etymology
The species name refers to the type locality, Caraca.

References

Moths described in 2010
Gravitcornutia
Moths of South America
Taxa named by Józef Razowski